Peter Banda (born 22 September 2000) is a Malawian footballer who plays as a midfielder or winger for Tanzanian club Simba.

Career
Banda started his career with Griffin Young Stars in 2017. In 2018, he trialed for South African club Orlando Pirates. In 2019, he instead joined Big Bullets FC. Before the second half of the 2020–21 season, he signed for FC Sheriff Tiraspol in Moldova after a trial. On 3 August 2021, he signed a three-year contract with Tanzanian Premier League giant Simba S.C.

Personal life
He is the son of former footballer Chikondi Banda.

Honours
Big Bullets
 Super League of Malawi: 2019

Sheriff Tiraspol
 Moldovan National Division: 2020–21

References

External links
 

2000 births
Living people
Malawian footballers
Malawian expatriate footballers
Expatriate footballers in Moldova
Malawian expatriate sportspeople in Moldova
Expatriate footballers in Tanzania
Malawian expatriate sportspeople in Tanzania
Nyasa Big Bullets FC players
FC Sheriff Tiraspol players
Simba S.C. players
Moldovan Super Liga players
Malawi international footballers
Association football wingers
Association football midfielders
Malawi under-20 international footballers
Malawi youth international footballers
2021 Africa Cup of Nations players
Tanzanian Premier League players